Mocopulli Airport (Aerodromo Mocopulli)  is an airport serving Dalcahue, a port city on Chiloé Island in the Los Lagos Region of Chile.

The Mocopulli VOR-DME (Ident: MPI) is located on the field.

Airline and destinations

See also

Transport in Chile
List of airports in Chile

References

External links
Mocopulli Airport at OpenStreetMap
Mocopulli Airport at OurAirports

Mocopulli Airport at FallingRain

Airports in Chile
Airports in Chiloé Archipelago